OGLE-TR-182b is a transiting extrasolar planet. It is a hot Jupiter with a similar mass to Jupiter but a larger radius.

See also 
 Optical Gravitational Lensing Experiment OGLE

References

External links 

 

Hot Jupiters
Transiting exoplanets
Exoplanets discovered in 2007
Giant planets
Carina (constellation)